Eilema chrysophlebs is a moth of the subfamily Arctiinae first described by George Hampson in 1895. It is found in Bhutan.

References

Moths described in 1895
chrysophlebs